A leucotome or McKenzie Leucotome is a surgical instrument used for performing leucotomies (also known as lobotomy) and other forms of psychosurgery.
 
Invented by Canadian neurosurgeon Dr. Kenneth G. McKenzie in the 1940s, the leucotome has a narrow shaft which is inserted into the brain through a hole in the skull, and then a plunger on the back of the leucotome is depressed to extend a wire loop or metal strip into the brain. The leucotome is then rotated, cutting a core of brain tissue. This type was used by the Nobel prize-winning Portuguese neurologist Egas Moniz.

Another, different, surgical instrument also called a leucotome was introduced by Walter Freeman for use in the transorbital lobotomy. Modeled after an ice-pick, it consisted simply of a pointed shaft. It was passed through the tear duct under the eyelid and against the top of the eyesocket. A mallet was used to drive the instrument through the thin layer of bone and into the brain along the plane of the bridge of the nose, to a depth of 5 cm. Due to incidents of breakage, a stronger but essentially identical instrument called an orbitoclast was later used.

Lobotomies were commonly performed from the 1930s to the 1960s, with a few as late as the 1980s in France.

See also
Orbitoclast
Lobotomy
Instruments used in general surgery

Notes

External links
 A leucotome from the University of Manchester Medical School Museum
 The Nobel Foundation page on prefrontal leukotomy

Neurosurgery
History of neuroscience
Surgical instruments
Lobotomy